Ocean Parkway may refer to:
 Ocean Parkway (Brooklyn), a boulevard in the west-central portion of the New York City borough of Brooklyn
 Ocean Parkway (BMT Brighton Line), an express station on the New York City Subway's BMT Brighton Line
 Ocean Parkway (Long Island), a parkway that traverses Jones Beach Island between Jones Beach State Park and Captree State Park on Long Island, New York

See also

Ocean Park (disambiguation)